Double Fine Comics is a webcomics collective supported by Double Fine Productions. Each comic varies in style and tone, but they all reflect the eclectic humor found in the Double-Fine produced game Psychonauts. The webcomics were published in Adobe Flash format on the company website under the heading 'Comics'.

Artists 
The Double Fine comics are produced by six artists who work (or used to work) for Double Fine Productions.

Double Fine Action Comics 
Scott Campbell (also known as Scott C.) created a comic called Double Fine Action Comics. It follows the adventures of Two-Headed Baby (the Double Fine Productions logo), a strongman, and a knight. Other characters, such as two astronauts named Captain and Thompson have been introduced as the comic has progressed. Many characters such as a mummy, a frogman and a naked ogre have been briefly featured, usually during a quest or some other type of adventure. At the top of most strips is a small, usually completely unrelated drawing. These small drawings sometimes have a title, such as "Mysterious Happiness!". The strip celebrated its 400th comic in December 2006. In August 2011, Scott implied the end of the comic with the deflation of 2HB and the solemn acceptance of both Knight and Strongman. The comic was resurrected in May 2012, before it returned to hiatus status a few months later.

In 2008, the first 300 comics were combined into a trade paperback called Double Fine Action Comics by Scott C (Volume 1).  This volume includes a foreword by Tim Schafer.

In 2013, 200 more comics were combined into another trade paperback called Double Fine Action Comics by Scott C (Volume 2).  This volume contains a foreword by Erik Wolpaw.

Epic Saga and Happy Funnies 
Razmig Mavlian (also known as Raz) produces two comics. The first, Epic Saga, is done in the style of an adventure game similar to King's Quest or The Secret of Monkey Island. The last two comics were countdown screens, similar to the screens of arcade games, which seem to indicate that the strip is cancelled or currently on hiatus. Mavlian's other comic, Happy Funnies, is a dialogue-free strip featuring smiling characters in absurd situations. This strip appears to be on hiatus as well.

Epic Saga was the first comic to be made into a free flash video game by Klint Honeychurch. Epic Saga: Extreme Fighter is a simple low resolution fighting game which is available to play for free on Double Fine's website.

My Comic About Me 
Nathan Stapley draws a pseudo-biographical comic that juxtaposes comics about his hair or clothing with adventure stories involving him and such characters as Indiana Jones, Chewbacca from Star Wars, or O-Ren Ishii from the Kill Bill films.  The comic appears to be on hiatus.

My Comic About Me was the second comic to be made into a free flash video game by Klint Honeychurch. My Game About Me: Olympic Challenge is a mock sports game that includes such events as eating and sleeping along with traditional sports games like surfing, but with obstacles to avoid.

Snapshots 
Snapshots (formerly known as Polaroids) is a comic by Mark Hamer.  He paints realistic pictures that resemble Polaroid photographs. Each feature a joke about the picture at the bottom of the photograph.

In 2013, the comics were compiled into a book titled Snapshots.  The book contains a foreword by Tim Schafer and an introduction by Scott Campbell.

Tasha's Comic 
Tasha Harris created a fifth comic, which was added in January 2008. The comic is a semi-autobiographical serial about the life of the author, and her boyfriend and two cats. Tasha's comic has been moved to her personal blog, "Tasha's Quest Log", as of September 2011, when she left Double Fine.  The comic continued to be updated regularly until 2013. The current state of the comic is unknown.

Tasha's Comic was the third comic to be made into a free flash video game by Klint Honeychurch. Tasha's Game is a platform puzzle game where Tasha has to rescue her family and co-workers from a mysterious entity, aided by her cat Snoopy who acts as a cursor allowing Tasha to place platforms in order to get to out of reach areas.

Dirt Nap 
Gabe Miller's comic, "Dirt Nap," started in October 2009. It covers the adventures of an unwilling zombie as he searches for his identity, and as he and his zombie friends try to avoid being killed. The comic updates regularly.

References

Webcomic syndicates
Comics
2004 webcomic debuts